Alexander Bay Airport  is an airport serving Alexander Bay (Namakwa District Municipality), a town in the Northern Cape province of South Africa.

Facilities
It has one asphalt paved runway designated 01/19 which measures .

See also
 List of airports in South Africa

References

External links
 
 

Airports in South Africa
Transport in the Northern Cape
Namakwa District Municipality